Osei Bonsu (October 22, 1900 – March 1, 1977) was a Ghanaian sculptor and practitioner of Ashanti carving.

Life and career

Bonsu was born on October 22, 1900. He was taught carving as an apprentice under his father. He got his start via commissions from Akan chiefs. He carved prolifically from his early twenties to his death in 1977. He was the chief carver of three Asantehene (absolute monarchs of the Kingdom of Ashanti): Prempeh I, Osei Tutu Agyeman Prempeh II, and Opoku Ware II. In this role he gained many commissions, including work for the Ghana National Museum.

In 1975 and 1976, Bonsu toured the United States as part of the Smithsonian Institution's Festival of American Folklore.

Works and style

After Prempeh I's return from exile, Bonsu was commissioned to various regalia including linguist staffs, sword hilts, flywhisk sandals, and ornaments for sandals. Importantly, he was also asked to help in reconstructing the Golden Stool, the famous symbol of power for Ashanti monarchs.

His work is on display in the British Museum, the Ghana National Museum, and the Fowler Museum at UCLA.

References

External links 
The Art of Osei Bonsu

1900 births
1977 deaths
Akan people
20th-century Ghanaian sculptors
Ghanaian male artists
Male sculptors
People from Kumasi